Provincial road N309 (N309) is a road connecting Rijksweg 6 (A6) and N302 in Lelystad with A50 near Epe.

External links

309
309
309